Pegli is a neighbourhood in the west of Genoa, Italy.

With a mild climate and a sea promenade, Pegli is mainly a residential area with four public parks and several villas and mansions. It is also known as a tourist resort with some hotels, camping and bathing establishments. Many restaurants and shops characterize the town, which is connected to central Genoa by railway, water bus and bus.

Notable natives
Fabrizio De André - Italian singer and songwriter
Renzo Piano - Italian architect
Liliana Ross – Italian-born Chilean actress 

the following lived in Pegli for a long time
Alberto Lupo - Italian Actor
Gino Paoli  - Italian recording artist

According to an oral tradition, on November 21, 1854, Giacomo Della Chiesa, later to become Pope Benedict XV, would have been born in Pegli, in the holiday palace of the Marquises Della Chiesa. In front of the palace, where he often stayed as a child and sometimes as an adult before his election to the papal throne, there is a small monument, whose inscription claims the birth of the future pope. However more reliable sources say he was born in the main family palace, in via di Santa Caterina, in the center of Genoa.

References

External links 

Quartieri of Genoa
Former municipalities of the Province of Genoa